Senik is a settlement in the Slovene Hills in the Municipality of Sveti Tomaž in northeastern Slovenia. The area belonged to the traditional region of Styria. It is now included in the Drava Statistical Region.

There is a small chapel-shrine with a belfry in the village. It dates to the early 20th century.

References

External links
Senik on Geopedia

Populated places in the Municipality of Sveti Tomaž